Mouřínov is a municipality and village in Vyškov District in the South Moravian Region of the Czech Republic. It has about 500 inhabitants.

Notable people
Antonín Pospíšil (1903–1973), politician

References

Villages in Vyškov District